Culler is a surname. Notable people with the surname include:

David Culler (born 1959), computer scientist
Dick Culler (1915–1964), baseball shortstop
Glen Culler (1927–2003), professor of electrical engineering
Marc Culler (born 1953), American mathematician
Jonathan Culler (born 1944), Professor of English at Cornell University